Emily Maguire (born 17 December 1987 in Glasgow) is a Scottish international field hockey player who plays as a defender. She represented Great Britain at the 2012 Summer Olympics. She competed for the national team in the women's tournament, winning a bronze medal.

With over 150 international caps, she also represented Scotland at the 2010 and 2014 Commonwealth Games Maguire helped Scotland retain its A division status at the EHF Nations Championship in 2013 and in 2015.

In June 2015 she was selected in the victorious Great Britain team at the 2015 Hockey World League Semi Finals which secured qualification for the 2016 Summer Olympics.

Maguire currently plays club hockey in the Investec Women's Hockey League Conference East for Hampstead & Westminster.

She is a product of the Kelburne Hockey Club, Paisley, Scotland. She has also played club hockey for Reading (2009–15) and for Holcombe (2015–17).

Maguire retired from international hockey in November 2016 with a total of 177 international caps (118 caps for Scotland and 59 for caps Great Britain).

She graduated with a degree in Mathematics and Statistics from the University of Glasgow in 2009.

Maguire works at Investec Bank in the Corporate and Institutional Treasury Desk.

Club honours
England Hockey League
Winners: 2010–11, 2012–13
England Hockey Indoor Championships
Winners: 2012–13, 2013–14
EuroHockey Club Champions Trophy
Winners 2012–13
EuroHockey Indoor Club Champions Trophy
Winners: 2013–14

References

External links 
 
Emily Maguire profile  Great Britain Hockey.
Emily Maguire profile Team GB.

1987 births
Living people
British female field hockey players
Scottish female field hockey players
Field hockey players at the 2012 Summer Olympics
Olympic field hockey players of Great Britain
Olympic medalists in field hockey
Olympic bronze medallists for Great Britain
Medalists at the 2012 Summer Olympics
Holcombe Hockey Club players
Hampstead & Westminster Hockey Club players
Reading Hockey Club players
Women's England Hockey League players
Field hockey players at the 2010 Commonwealth Games
Field hockey players at the 2014 Commonwealth Games
Commonwealth Games competitors for Scotland
Scottish Olympic medallists